Paragryllacris is a genus of Australian Orthopterans, sometimes known as 'leaf-folding crickets' in the family Gryllacridinae, erected by the Swiss entomologist Carl Brunner von Wattenwyl in 1888.  It is fairly typical for its tribe Paragryllacridini. However, in a large comparison of 650 insect species, Australian Raspy Crickets were found to be the insect with the strongest bite.

Species 
The Orthoptera Species File lists:
 Paragryllacris combusta Gerstaecker, 1860- type species (locality: Sydney, New South Wales, Australia)
 Paragryllacris fissa Karny, 1929
 Paragryllacris griffinii Hebard, 1922
 Paragryllacris nigrosulcata Karny, 1929

References

External links
Photo at BrisbaneInsects.com

Ensifera genera
Gryllacrididae
Orthoptera of Australia